Trevor Hirschfield (born December 21, 1983) is a Canadian Wheelchair rugby player, who participated Beijing, London, and Rio Paralympic Games. At the age of 16, after a traffic accident where his van went over a cliff, he was paralyzed below the neck. During the 2012 Summer Paralympics his team won 58–50 over Belgium with Hirschfield toppling their star Lars Mertens.

References

External links
 
 Trevor Hirschfield at the Canadian Wheelchair Sports Association
 
 

1983 births
Living people
Canadian wheelchair rugby players
People from Parksville, British Columbia
Sportspeople from British Columbia
Paralympic silver medalists for Canada
Paralympic bronze medalists for Canada
Medalists at the 2008 Summer Paralympics
Medalists at the 2012 Summer Paralympics
Paralympic medalists in wheelchair rugby
Wheelchair rugby players at the 2008 Summer Paralympics
Wheelchair rugby players at the 2012 Summer Paralympics
Wheelchair rugby players at the 2016 Summer Paralympics
Paralympic wheelchair rugby players of Canada